The Equestrian competition at the 2010 Central American and Caribbean Games was held in Mayagüez, Puerto Rico. 

The tournament was scheduled to be held from 21–30 July at the La Sebastina in Bayamón.

Medal summary

Individual events

Team events

External links

Events at the 2010 Central American and Caribbean Games
July 2010 sports events in North America
Equestrian at the Central American and Caribbean Games
2010 in equestrian
Equestrian sports in Puerto Rico